Florence Barker (23 March 1908 – 1986) was a competitive swimmer who represented Great Britain at the 1924 Summer Olympics in Paris, where she won a silver medal as a member of the second-place British women's team in the 4×100-metre freestyle relay event.  In individual competition, she advanced to the semi-finals of the women's 100-metre freestyle event, finishing ninth overall.

See also
 List of Olympic medalists in swimming (women)

References

External links
 British Olympic Association athlete profile 

1908 births
1986 deaths
British female freestyle swimmers
Olympic silver medallists for Great Britain
Olympic swimmers of Great Britain
Swimmers at the 1924 Summer Olympics
Medalists at the 1924 Summer Olympics
Olympic silver medalists in swimming